The Tunisian Rugby Federation is the governing body for rugby union in Tunisia. It was founded in 1970 and became affiliated to the International Rugby Board in 1988.

See also
 Tunisia national rugby union team
 Tunisia national rugby sevens team
 Rugby union in Tunisia

References

Rugby union in Tunisia
Rugby
Rugby union governing bodies in Africa

Sports organizations established in 1972